Hungry Beat is a 2022 book published by white Rabbit Books and written by Grant McPhee and Douglas MacIntyre with Neil Cooper. It is an oral history of Scotland's Post-Punk scene, focussing on the record labels Fast Product and Postcard Records. The introduction was written by Ian Rankin.

The interviews were primarily conducted for 2015 documentary, Big Gold Dream and later fleshed out to include new contributions

The book will feature as part of an event at the 2023 edition of Celtic Connections.

Reception 
The book has been warmly received, garnering positive reviews from various critics.

Alistair Braidwood of the publication Snackmag wrote:

Mojo Magazine wrote:

External links
Hungry Beat on Google Books

References 

History books about Scotland
2022 non-fiction books
English-language books